Mirza Fatali Akhundov, also known as Mirza Fatali Akhundzade, or Mirza Fath-Ali Akhundzadeh (12 July 1812 – 9 March 1878), was a celebrated Iranian Azerbaijani author, playwright, atheist, philosopher, and founder of Azerbaijani modern literary criticism, "who acquired fame primarily as the writer of European-inspired plays in the Azeri Turkic language".

Akhundzade singlehandedly opened a new stage of development of Azerbaijani literature. He was also the founder of the materialism and atheism movement in the Republic of Azerbaijan and one of forerunners of modern Iranian nationalism. He also advocated switching the Azerbaijani writing system from the Perso-Arabic script to the Latin alphabet.

According to the historian and political scientist Zaur Gasimov, the entirety of Akhundzadeh's intellectual landscape was "densely entangled with Persian thought". Akhundzadeh defined his kinsmen as Turki but at the same time considered Iran his fatherland.

Life 
Akhundzade was born in 1812 in Nukha (present-day Shaki, Azerbaijan) to a wealthy landowning family from Iranian Azerbaijan. He was ethnically an Azerbaijani. His parents, and especially his uncle Haji Alaskar, who was Fatali's first teacher, prepared young Fatali for a career in Shi'a clergy, but the young man was attracted to the literature. In 1832, while in Ganja, Akhundzade came into contact with the poet Mirza Shafi Vazeh, who introduced him to Western secular thought and discouraged him from pursuing a religious career. Later in 1834 Akhundzade moved to Tiflis (present-day Tbilisi, Georgia), and spent the rest of his life working as a translator of Oriental languages in the service of the Russian Empire's Viceroyalty. Concurrently, from 1837 onwards he worked as a teacher in Tbilisi uezd Armenian school, then in Nersisyan school. In Tiflis his acquaintance and friendship with the exiled Russian Decembrists Alexander Bestuzhev-Marlinsky, Vladimir Odoyevsky, poet Yakov Polonsky, Armenian writers Khachatur Abovian, Gabriel Sundukyan and others played some part in the formation of Akhundzade's Europeanized outlook.

Akhundzade's first published work was The Oriental Poem (1837), written to lament the death of the great Russian poet Alexander Pushkin. But the rise of Akhundzade's literary activity comes in the 1850s. In the first half of the 1850s, Akhundzade wrote six comedies( Hekayati Molla Ibrahim-Khalil Kimyagar, The story of Monsieur Jourdan, a botanist and the dervish Mastalishah, a famous sorcerer, Adventures of the Lenkaran Khanate Vizier) – the first comedies in Azerbaijani literature as well as the first samples of the national dramaturgy. The comedies by Akhundzade are unique in their critical pathos, analysis of the realities in Azerbaijan of the first half of the 19th century. These comedies found numerous responses in the Russian other foreign periodical press. The German Magazine of Foreign Literature called Akhundzade "dramatic genius", "the Azerbaijani Molière" 1. Akhundzade's sharp pen was directed against everything that he believed hindered the advance of the Russian Empire, which for Akhundzade was a force for modernisation, in spite of the atrocities it committed in its southern advance against Akhundzade's own kin. According to Walter Kolarz:

The greatest Azerbaidzhani poet of the nineteenth century, Mirza Fathali Akhundov (1812–78), who is called the "Molière of the Orient", was so completely devoted to the Russian cause that he urged his compatriots to fight Turkey during the Crimean War.

In 1859 Akhundzade published his short but famous novel The Deceived Stars. In this novel he laid the foundation of Azerbaijani realistic historical prose, giving the models of a new genre in Azerbaijani literature. Through his comedies and dramas, Akhundzade established realism as the leading trend in Azerbaijani literature.

According to Ronald Grigor Suny:
Turkish nationalism, which developed in part as a reaction to the nationalism of the Christian minorities [of the Ottoman Empire], was, like Armenian nationalism, heavily influenced by thinkers who lived and were educated in the Russian Empire. The Crimean Tatar Ismail Bey Gasprinski and the Azerbaijani writer Mirza Fath Ali Akhundzade inspired Turkish intellectuals in the late nineteenth and early twentieth centuries.

According to Tadeusz Swietochowski:
In his glorification of the pre-Islamic greatness of Iran, before it was destroyed at the hands of the "hungry, naked and savage Arabs", "Akhundzade was one of the forerunners of modern Iranian nationalism, and of its militant manifestations at that. Nor was he devoid of anti-Ottoman sentiments, and in his spirit of the age-long Iranian Ottoman confrontation, he ventured into his writing on the victory of Shah Abbas I over the Turks at Baghdad. Akhundzade is counted as one of the founders of modern Iranian literature, and his formative influence is visible in such major Persian-language writers as Malkum Khan, Mirza Agha Khan and Mirza Abdul-Rahim Talibov Tabrizi. All of them were advocates of reforms in Iran. If Akhundzade had no doubt that his spiritual homeland was Iran, Azerbaijan was the land he grew up and whose language was his native tongue. His lyrical poetry was written in Persian, but his work carries messages of social importance as written in the language of the people of his native land, Azari. With no indication of split-personality, he combined larger Iranian identity with Azerbaijani—he used the term vatan (fatherland) in reference to both."

Reza Zia-Ebrahimi too considers Akhundzade as the founding father of what he calls 'dislocative nationalism' in Iran. According to Zia-Ebrahimi, Akhundzade found inspiration in Orientalist templates to construct a vision of ancient Iran, which offered intellectuals disgruntled with the pace of modernist reform in Iran, a self-serving narrative where all of Iran's shortcomings are blamed on a monolithic and otherized 'other': the Arab. For Zia-Ebrahimi, Akhundzade must be credit with the introduction of ethno-racial ideas, particularly the opposition between the Iranian Aryan and the Arab Semite, into Iran's intellectual debates. Zia-Ebrahimi disputes that Akhundzade had any influence on modernist intellectuals such as Malkum Khan (beyond a common project to reform the Alphabet used to write Persian) or Talibov Tabrizi. His real heir was Kermani, and these two intellectuals' legacy is to be found in the ethnic nationalism of the Pahlavi state, rather than the civic nationalism of the Constitutional movement.

While Akundzadeh is said to have been an atheist, he was very sympathetic to the Zoroastrian religion and was in correspondence with Manekji Limji Hataria.

At that time the Qajar dynasty was in great crisis as a consequence of their failures against the Russian empire and the British, and their corruption and mismanagement. This gave rise to the Constitutional movement. According to these intellectuals Iran needed political change to a constitutional parliamentarian model of governance. But for some intellectuals like Akhundzadeh this was not enough.

He argued that the Arabs and Islam were responsible for the downturn of Iranian civilization and argued that Iranians should look back to their glorious pre-Islamic civilization. In the Maktubàt-e Kamàl od-Dowleh beh Shàhzadeh Jamàl od-Dowleh (Letters from Kamal od-Dowleh to Prince Jalal od-Dowleh, 1860, hereafter Maktubàt) his vision on the glorious pre-islamic past is portrayed. Just like Jalal ed-Din Mirza Qajar, with whom he  corresponded, he argued that Arabic loanwords, alphabet and Islam should be removed. If this is accomplished, then according to him Iran can return to its glorious state. He was the first to compile these ideas into a coherent nationalist ideology, which makes him the father of Iranian nationalism.
Akhundzadeh was also an atheist, but he made an exception for Zoroastrianism, which he saw as a great religion and the true Iranian religion. He hoped that it would one day replace Islam again and so tried to promote it with his Maktubàt.

The ‘Sultans of Islam’ will be ‘kinder to your kin than to their own brother and father’. They ‘will deplore the fact that they did not know you until today and that throughout the history of Islam they have supported and admired Arabs, who are their enemies ... who destroyed their country’, rather than Zoroastrians who are ‘their brothers, who speak the same language [sic], their compatriots, the living memory of their glorious forefathers, and their guardian angels’.

Akhundzadeh was under the spell of what seems to be Manekji’s archaistic charisma, a sort of magnetism stemming from the special knowledge of the glorious past that he was perceived to possess. Akhundzadeh put him on a pedestal because he saw him as an emissary of this Golden Age for which he and Jalal ed-Din Mirza longed, as if Manekji had just walked out of a time machine. In another letter, this admiration of Manekji becomes more evident: ‘my wish is that . . .Iranians knew that we are the children of the Parsis, that our home is Iran, that zeal, honour, idealism and our celestial aspirations demand that we favour our kin. . . rather than alien bloodthirsty bandits’ (Akhundzadeh to Manekji, 29 July 1871, in Mohammadzadeh and Arasli 1963:249, emphasis added). It is very revealing that Akhundzadeh called Iranians the ‘children’ of the Parsis. He accorded Parsis a genealogical ascendancy that can only be explained by the fact that he considered them as a kind of pure Iranians uncontaminated by Arabs and Islam, who should be ‘followed’ by the contemporary debased Muslim lot. He then added that ‘my appearance is that of a Turk, but I am of the Parsis’ race’.

In the 1920s, the Azerbaijan State Academic Opera and Ballet Theatre was named after Akhundzade.

Iranian nationalism 
Akhundzade identified himself as belonging to the nation of Iran (mellat-e Irān) and to the Iranian homeland (vaṭan). He corresponded with Jālāl-al-Din Mirzā (a minor Qajar prince, son of Bahman Mirza Qajar,1826–70) and admired this latter's epic Nāmeh-ye Khosrovān ('Book of Sovereigns'), which was an attempt to offer the modern reader biography of Iran's ancient kings, real and mythical, without recourse to any Arabic loanword. The Nāmeh presented the pre-Islamic past as one of grandeur, and the advent of Islam as a radical rupture.

Dislocative nationalism is thus predicated on more than a total distinction between supposedly Aryan Iranians and Semitic Arabs, as it is suggested that the two races are incompatible and in opposition to each other. These ideas are directly indebted to nineteenth-century racial thought, particularly the Aryan race hypothesis developed by European comparative philologists (a hypothesis that Zia-Ebrahimi discusses at length ). Dislocative nationalism presents the pre-Islamic past as the site of a timeless Iranian essence, dismisses the Islamic period as one of decay, and blames all of Iran's shortcomings in the years after on Arabs and the adoption of Islam. The advent of Islam is thus ethnicised into an 'Arab invasion' and perceived as a case of racial contamination or miscegenation.

Mirza Aqa Khan Kermani (1854–96) was one of Akhundzades disciples, and three decades later will endeavour to disseminate Akhundzade's thought while also significantly strengthening its racial content. Mirza Aqa Khan Kermani also followed Jalāl-al-Din Mirzā in producing a national history of Iran, Āʾine-ye sekandari (The Alexandrian Mirror), extending from the mythological past to the Qajar era, again to contrast a mythified and fantasised pre-Islamic past with a present that falls short of nationalist expectations.

Alphabet reform 

Well ahead of his time, Akhundzade was a keen advocate for alphabet reform, recognizing deficiencies of Perso-Arabic script with regards to Turkic sounds. He began his work regarding alphabet reform in 1850. His first efforts focused on modifying the Perso-Arabic script so that it would more adequately satisfy the phonetic requirements of the Azerbaijani language. First, he insisted that each sound be represented by a separate symbol – no duplications or omissions. The Perso-Arabic script expresses only three vowel sounds, whereas Azeri needs to identify nine vowels. Later, he openly advocated the change from Perso-Arabic to a modified Latin alphabet. The Latin script which was used in Azerbaijan between 1922 and 1939, and the Latin script which is used now, were based on Akhundzade's third version.

Family 
His parents' was Mirza Mahammad Taghi (born in Khamaneh) and Nane Khanum. He married Tubu Khanum, his mother's cousin in 1842. He had 13 children of whom only 2 (Nisa and Rashid) reached maturity. His second marriage was to Nazli Beyim, a descendant of Javad Khan, with whom he fathered Sayrabayim. He married off both Nisa and Sayrabayim to Khan Baba Mirza from the Bahmani family. His grandson Fatali was purged in 1938.

Legacy

Besides his role in Azerbaijani literature and Iranian nationalism, Akhundzadeh was also known for his harsh criticisms of religions (mainly Islam) and stays as the most iconic Azerbaijani atheist. National Library of Azerbaijan and Azerbaijan State Academic Opera and Ballet Theatre, as well as a couple of streets, parks, and libraries, are also named after Akhundzade in Azerbaijan. A cultural museum in Tbilisi, Georgia that focuses on Georgian-Azerbaijani cultural relations is also named after him.

Punik, a town in Armenia was also named in the honour of Akhundzade until very recently. TURKSOY hosted a groundbreaking ceremony to declare 2012 as the year of Mirza Fatali Akhundzade.

House Museum

Mirza Fatali Akhundov's house museum is the house museum of Mirza Fatali Akhundov, an Azerbaijani writer, educator, poet, materialist philosopher and public figure, founder of Azerbaijani drama and literary criticism in Azerbaijani literature, located in Sheki. Akhundov was born in this house and spent his childhood and adolescence here. This museum is also the first memorial museum opened in Azerbaijan.

History 
The house was built in 1800. In 1811, it was taken by Mirza Fatali Akhundov's father Mirza Mohammad Taghi. Mirza Fatali Akhundov was born here in 1812. Two years later, Akhundov's father moved with his family to Khamna village near Tabriz. Mirza Fatali's parents divorced when he was 13 years old. Later, in 1825, Akhundov returned to Sheki with his family. From this period, his mother's uncle Akhund Haji Alasgar began to take care of him. In 1833 he entered the Russian school opened in Sheki, and after studying there for a year he went to Tbilisi in 1834. In 1940, a museum was established in this house. In 2012, in honor of the 200th anniversary of Akhundov, the museum was overhauled.

Description 
The house museum of Mirza Fatali Akhundov in Sheki is the first memorial museum opened in Azerbaijan. The museum consisted of two small interlocking rooms. There is another building near the house. It was built later and an exposition on the life and work of the great writer was created here. M. F. Akhundov's house museum consists of 2 buildings, an exposition hall dedicated to his life and work and the house where Akhundov was born.

The house was built of raw brick in the Sheki architectural tradition around 1800 and consists of two rooms, a balcony and a basement. There is a wooden structure between the floors. The stove also shows that the building was built in an oriental style. Antiques are exhibited in the rooms. In the past, there were stone and brick walls in the yard, a brick arched gate in the eastern style, and another two-storey, basement house made of raw bricks belonging to Mirza Fatali Akhundzadeh's cousins.

The Exposition Hall was built in 1975. The house-museum of Mirza Fatali Akhundzadeh was repaired in 2011–2012. The museum displays 248 exhibits.

Photos

Bibliography
Major works:

 Комедии Мирзы Фетъ-Али-Ахундова (Comedies of Mirza Fatali Akhundov). Tiflis, 1853
 Tamsīlāt-i Kaputan Mīrzā Fath-ʿAlī Āḵūndzāda (Collection of plays of Mirza Fatali Akhundzade). Tiflis, 1860

Works on literary criticism:
 Qirītīkah (Criticism)
 Risālah-i īrād (Fault-finding treatise)
 Fann-i kirītīkah (Art of criticism)
 Darbārah-i Mullā-yi Rūmī va tasnīf-i ū (On Rumi and his work)
 Darbārah-i nazm va nasr (On verse and prose)
 Fihrist-i kitāb (Preface to the book)
 Maktūb bih Mīrzā Āqā Tabrīzī (Letter to Mīrzā Āqā Tabrīzī)
 Uṣūl-i nigārish (Principles of writing)

See also 
 Mirza Fatali Akhundov National Library of Azerbaijan
 Mirza Fatali Akhundov State Prize of the Azerbaijan SSR

References

Further reading

External links 
 Biography.
 Akhundov: Alphabet Reformer Before His Time, Azerbaijan International, Vol 8:1 (Spring 2000).
 http://mirslovarei.com/content_fil/AXUNDOV-MIRZA-FATALI-2072.html

Azerbaijani-language writers
19th-century Persian-language writers
Writers from the Russian Empire
Iranian male writers
19th-century Iranian philosophers
Philosophers from the Russian Empire
Iranian Azerbaijanis
Iranian atheists
Azerbaijani atheists
Atheist philosophers
Atheism activists
Iranian nationalists
Iranian revolutionaries
People of the Persian Constitutional Revolution
1812 births
1878 deaths
People from Shaki, Azerbaijan
19th-century Azerbaijani philosophers
19th-century atheists
Former Muslims turned agnostics or atheists
Burials at Pantheon of prominent Azerbaijanis